Keshabad may refer to:

Keshabad-e Olya, Qazvin Province
Keshabad-e Sofla, Qazvin Province